Kristen Fraser (born 27 May 1988) is a Scottish professional boxer who has held the Commonwealth female bantamweight title since 2018.

Professional career
Fraser made her professional debut on 31 March 2017, scoring a six-round points decision (PTS) victory Lana Cooper at the DoubleTree by Hilton Hotel in Aberdeen, Scotland.

After compiling a record of 5–0 (1 KO), she faced Ellen Simwaka for the inaugural Commonwealth female bantamweight title on 24 November 2018 at the DoubleTree by Hilton Hotel. Fraser knocked her opponent down in the fourth round en route to a fifth-round stoppage victory via corner retirement (RTD) after Simwaka's corner pulled her out of the fight at the end of the fifth. With the win, Fraser became Scotland's first female to win a Commonwealth title.

Professional boxing record

References

Living people
1988 births
British women boxers
Sportspeople from Aberdeen
Bantamweight boxers
Featherweight boxers
Commonwealth Boxing Council champions